In the study of the representation theory  of Lie groups, the study of representations of SU(2) is fundamental to the study of representations of semisimple Lie groups. It is the first case of a Lie group that is both a compact group and a non-abelian group. The first condition implies the representation theory is discrete: representations are direct sums of a collection of basic irreducible representations (governed by the Peter–Weyl theorem). The second means that there will be irreducible representations in dimensions greater than 1.

SU(2) is the universal covering group of SO(3), and so its representation theory includes that of the latter, by dint of a surjective homomorphism to it.  This underlies the significance of SU(2) for the description of non-relativistic spin in theoretical physics; see below for other physical and historical context.

As shown below, the finite-dimensional irreducible representations of SU(2) are indexed by a non-negative integer  and have dimension .

Lie algebra representations

Since the group SU(2) is simply connected, every representation of its Lie algebra can be integrated to a group representation; we will give an explicit construction of the representations at the group level below.

Real and complexified Lie algebras
The real Lie algebra  has a basis given by

The matrices are a representation of the quaternions:

where  is the conventional 2×2 identity matrix:

Consequently, the commutator brackets of the matrices satisfy

It is then convenient to pass to the complexified Lie algebra
 

(Skew self-adjoint matrices with trace zero plus self-adjoint matrices with trace zero gives all matrices with trace zero.) As long as we are working with representations over  this passage from real to complexified Lie algebra is harmless. The reason for passing to the complexification is that it allows us to construct a nice basis of a type that does not exist in the real Lie algebra .

or, explicitly, 

The non-trivial/non-identical part of the group's multiplication table is

where  is the 2×2 all-zero matrix.
Hence their commutation relations are

The factor of 2 is a discrepancy between conventions in math and physics; we will attempt to mention both conventions in the results that follow.

Weights and the structure of the representation
The following elementary result is a key step in the analysis.

Suppose now that  is an irreducible, finite-dimensional representation of the complexified Lie algebra. Then  can have only finitely many eigenvalues. In particular, there must be some final eigenvalue  with the property that  is not an eigenvalue.
 

then we must have
 

or else the above identity would tell us that  is an eigenvector with eigenvalue  

Now define a "chain" of vectors  by
.

A simple argument by induction then shows that
 

Let  be the last nonzero vector in the chain; that is,  but  Then of course  and by the above identity with  we have
 

Since  is at least one and  we conclude that  must be equal to the non-negative integer  

We thus obtain a chain of  vectors,  such that  acts as

and  acts as

and  acts as

Since  is assumed irreducible, this span must be all of  We thus obtain a complete description of what an irreducible representation must look like; that is, a basis for the space and a complete description of how the generators of the Lie algebra act. Conversely, for any  we can construct a representation by simply using the above formulas and checking that the commutation relations hold. This representation can then be shown to be irreducible.

Conclusion: For each non-negative integer  there is a unique irreducible representation with highest weight  Each irreducible representation is equivalent to one of these. The representation with highest weight  has dimension  with weights  each having multiplicity one.

The Casimir element
We now introduce the (quadratic) Casimir element,  given by
.

We can view  as an element of the universal enveloping algebra or as an operator in each irreducible representation. Viewing  as an operator on the representation with highest weight , we may easily compute that  commutes with each  Thus, by Schur's lemma,  acts as a scalar multiple  of the identity for each  We can write  in terms of the  basis as follows:

which can be reduced to
 

 

The group representations

Action on polynomials
Since SU(2) is simply connected, a general result shows that every representation of its (complexified) Lie algebra gives rise to a representation of SU(2) itself. It is desirable, however, to give an explicit realization of the representations at the group level. The group representations can be realized on spaces of polynomials in two complex variables. That is, for each non-negative integer , we let  denote the space of homogeneous polynomials  of degree  in two complex variables. There is a natural action of SU(2) on each , given by
.

The associated Lie algebra representation is simply the one described in the previous section. (See here for an explicit formula for the action of the Lie algebra on the space of polynomials.)

The characters
The character of a representation  is the function  given by
.
Characters plays an important role in the representation theory of compact groups. The character is easily seen to be a class function, that is, invariant under conjugation.

In the SU(2) case, the fact that the character is a class function means it is determined by its value on the maximal torus  consisting of the diagonal matrices in SU(2), since the elements are orthogonally diagonalizable with the spectral theorem. Since the irreducible representation with highest weight  has weights , it is easy to see that the associated character satisfies

This expression is a finite geometric series that can be simplified to

This last expression is just the statement of the Weyl character formula for the SU(2) case.

Actually, following Weyl's original analysis of the representation theory of compact groups, one can classify the representations entirely from the group perspective, without using Lie algebra representations at all. In this approach, the Weyl character formula plays an essential part in the classification, along with the Peter–Weyl theorem. The SU(2) case of this story is described here.

Relation to the representations of SO(3)

Note that either all of the weights of the representation are even (if  is even) or all of the weights are odd (if  is odd). In physical terms, this distinction is important: The representations with even weights correspond to ordinary representations of the rotation group SO(3). By contrast, the representations with odd weights correspond to double-valued (spinorial) representation of SO(3), also known as projective representations. 

In the physics conventions,  being even corresponds to  being an integer while  being odd corresponds to  being a half-integer. These two cases are described as integer spin and half-integer spin, respectively.

Another approach
See under the example for Borel–Weil–Bott theorem.

Most important irreducible representations and their applications

Representations of SU(2) describe non-relativistic spin, due to being a double covering of the rotation group of Euclidean 3-space. Relativistic spin is described by the representation theory of SL2(C), a supergroup of SU(2), which in a similar way covers SO+(1;3), the relativistic version of the rotation group. SU(2) symmetry also supports concepts of isobaric spin and weak isospin, collectively known as isospin.

When an element of SU(2) is written as a complex  matrix, it is simply a multiplication of column 2-vectors. It is known in physics as the spin-½ and, historically, as the multiplication of quaternions (more precisely, multiplication by a unit quaternion). This representation can also be viewed as a double-valued projective representation of the rotation group SO(3).

It describes 3-d rotations, the standard representation of SO(3), so real numbers are sufficient for it. Physicists use it for the description of massive spin-1 particles, such as vector mesons, but its importance for spin theory is much higher because it anchors spin states to the geometry of the physical 3-space. This representation emerged simultaneously with the 2 when William Rowan Hamilton introduced versors, his term for elements of SU(2). Note that Hamilton did not use standard group theory terminology since his work preceded Lie group developments.

The  (i.e. ) representation is used in particle physics for certain baryons, such as the Δ.

See also
 Rotation operator (vector space)
 Rotation operator (quantum mechanics)
 Representation theory of SO(3)
 Connection between SO(3) and SU(2)
 representation theory of SL2(R)
 Electroweak interaction
 Rotation group SO(3) § A note on Lie algebra

References

 
 Gerard 't Hooft (2007), Lie groups in Physics, Chapter 5 "Ladder operators"
 

Representation theory of Lie groups
Rotation in three dimensions